The following is a list of prominent people who were born in the U.S. state of Tennessee, live (or lived) in Tennessee, or for whom Tennessee is significant part of their identity:

A

Roy Acuff (1903–1992), musician; born in Maynardville
Charlie Adams, drummer
Calpernia Addams (born 1971), transgender actress; born in Nashville
James Agee (1909–1955); Pulitzer Prize-winning novelist, screenwriter, poet, critic; born in Knoxville
The Aldridge Sisters, singing duo on The Lawrence Welk Show (1977–1982)
Jessi Alexander (born 1976), singer-songwriter; born in Jackson
Lamar Alexander (born 1940), lawyer and U.S. Senator; born in Maryville
Duane Allman (1946–1971), guitarist; born in Nashville
Gregg Allman (1947–2017), singer-songwriter, musician; born in Nashville
Jarrod Alonge (born 1993), comedian and musician; lives in Chattanooga
Monroe Dunaway Anderson, banker, cotton trader; from Jackson
William R. Anderson (1921–2007), naval officer, politician; born in Humphreys County
Lona Andre (1915–1992), actress, golfer; born in Nashville
Jessica Andrews (born 1983), singer
Jill Andrews, singer-songwriter, musician, born in Johnson City
Lil Hardin Armstrong, jazz musician, wife of Louis Armstrong; from Memphis
Eddy Arnold (1918–2008), singer; born in Henderson
Victor Ashe, Knoxville mayor, Ambassador to Poland; born in Knoxville
Chet Atkins (1924–2001), guitarist and record producer; born in Luttrell
Doug Atkins (1930–2015), Pro Football Hall of Fame defensive end primarily with Chicago Bears
Rodney Atkins (born 1969), singer; born in Knoxville
Estelle Axton (1918-2004), co-founder of Stax Records

B

Nathan L. Bachman (1878–1937), U.S. Senator
DeFord Bailey (1897–1982), musician, Grand Ole Opry performer; from Smith County
Ed Bailey (1931–2007), baseball player
H. E. Bailey (1898 or 1899–1976)
Howard Baker (1925–2014), politician, U.S. Senator and White House Chief of Staff; born in Huntsville
Robert Baker (born 1979), actor; born in Memphis
Kelsea Ballerini (born 1993), singer; born in Mascot, grew up in Knoxville
Adrian Banks (born 1986), basketball player, 2011-12 top scorer in the Israel Basketball Premier League
Ava Barber (born 1954), singer; born in Knoxville
George Franklin Barber (1854–1915), architect; lived in Knoxville
Ronnie Barrett (born 1954), firearms manufacturer; born in Murfreesboro
Ross Bass (1918–1993), U.S. Senator
William M. Bass (born 1928), forensic anthropologist
William B. Bate (1826–1905), governor and U.S. Senator
Daren Bates (born 1990), football player; born in Memphis
Kathy Bates (born 1948), Academy Award-winning actress; born in Memphis
Kate Batts (also known as The Bell Witch), mythic poltergeist
Robin Beard (1939–2007), politician; born in Knoxville
Casey Beathard, songwriter; from Spring Hill
Bianca Belair (born 1989), WWE wrestler; born in Knoxville
Bill Belichick (born 1952), head coach of New England Patriots; born in Nashville
Brian Bell (born 1968), guitarist; from Knoxville
John Bell (1796–1869), politician, Secretary of War under William Henry Harrison; from Mill Creek
William Bell (born 1939), singer
Jeff Bennett (born 1980), baseball pitcher; born in Donelson
Aaron Benward (born 1973), singer
Polly Bergen (1930–2014), actress, singer, entrepreneur; born in Knoxville
George L. Berry (1882–1948), U.S. Senator
Mookie Betts (born 1992), baseball player; born in Brentwood
Greg Bird (born 1992), baseball player; born in Memphis
Tarik Black, basketball player
Joe Blanton (born 1980), baseball pitcher; born in Nashville
Jerry Blevins (born 1983), baseball pitcher; born in Johnson City
William Blount (1749–1800), statesman, governor and senator
Willie Blount (1768–1835), early governor of Tennessee
Julian Bond (1940–2015), activist, politician; born in Nashville
Alexander Bonnyman Jr. (1910–1943), decorated U.S. Marine; raised in Knoxville
Arna W. Bontemps (1902–1973), poet and novelist
Maci Bookout, reality TV personality
Pat Boone (born 1934), singer and actor; raised in Nashville
Rachel Boston (born 1982), actress; born in Chattanooga
Charles Boyce, syndicated cartoonist
Craig Wayne Boyd (born 1978), singer, winner of NBC's The Voice season 7; resides in Nashville
Richard Henry Boyd (1843–1922), founder, National Baptist Publishing Board
Jarrett Boykin (born 1989), football player; born in Chattanooga
Virginia Frazer Boyle (1863-1938), author, poet
Rod Brasfield (1910–1958), comedian
Corey Brewer (born 1986), basketball player; from Portland
Bill Brock (1930–2021), U.S. Senator and U.S. Secretary of Labor
Cary Brothers, indie rock singer-songwriter; from Nashville
Rex Brothers (born 1987), baseball player; born in Murfreesboro
Clarence Brown (1890–1987), film director; attended school in Knoxville
John C. Brown (1827–1889), governor
Marlon Brown (born 1991), football player; born in Memphis
Neill S. Brown (1810–1896), governor
Gordon Browning (1889–1976), governor
Jonathan Browning (1805–1879), maker of firearms; born in Sumner County
William Gannaway Brownlow (1805–1877), editor and governor
James M. Buchanan, economist, Nobel laureate
John P. Buchanan (1847–1930), governor
Josh Bullocks (born 1983), football player; born in Chattanooga
Frances Hodgson Burnett (1849–1924), English-born author; settled near Knoxville
Morgan Burnett, football player; born in Memphis
Kenneth C. Burns (1920–1989), musician, "Jethro" of Homer and Jethro
Charles Burson (born 1944), chief of staff for Al Gore; grew up in Shelby County
Kristian Bush (born 1970), singer; born in Knoxville
Jake Butcher (1936–2017), banker and politician
Carl Butler (1927–1992), singer-songwriter; born in Knoxville
Derrick Byars (born 1984), basketball player; born in Memphis
Bill Byrge (born 1932), actor, comedian; born in Nashville
Joseph W. Byrns (1869–1936), 14-term congressman; born in Cedar Hill

C

Matt Cain, baseball pitcher
Howard Caine, actor
Mike Caldwell, football player
Duke Calhoun, football player
Mickey Callaway, baseball pitcher, coach
Archie Campbell, entertainer, Hee Haw star
William B. Campbell, governor
Guy Carawan, folk musician
Hattie Caraway, politician
Deana Carter, singer
Dixie Carter, actress
Kellye Cash, 1987 Miss America
June Carter Cash, singer
Rosanne Cash, singer
David Catching, singer
John Catron, Supreme Court justice
Tracy Caulkins, Olympic gold-medalist swimmer (born in Minnesota)
Benjamin F. Cheatham, Confederate general
Doc Cheatham, musician
Kitty Cheatham, singer
Richard Boone Cheatham, 19th-century mayor of Nashville
Richard Cheatham, 19th-century congressman
John R. Cherry III, film director
Kenny Chesney, singer
Henry Cho, comedian
Tyson Clabo, football player
 Alysha Clark (born 1987), American-Israeli basketball player for the Seattle Storm of the Women's National Basketball Association
Philander P. Claxton, educator
Jim Clayton, housing developer
Frank G. Clement, governor of Te
John Ray Clemmons (born 1977), member of the Tennessee House of Representatives
Chad Clifton, football player
Randall Cobb, football player
Fred Coe, television producer and director
Michael Coe, football player
Lynnette Cole, Miss USA 2000
Mark Collie, singer
Todd Collins, football player
Britton Colquitt, football player
Dustin Colquitt, punter for NFL's Kansas City Chiefs
Darby Conley, cartoonist
Lester Conner, basketball player and coach
Barry Cook, film director
John Cooper, musician, lead singer of Christian rock band Skillet
Prentice Cooper, governor
Mary Costa, opera singer, actress
Jerome Courtland, actor, director
John I. Cox, governor
Morgan Cox, football player
Cylk Cozart, actor
Zack Cozart, baseball player
James Craig, actor
David "Davy" Crockett, frontiersman, politician, hero of the Alamo
Dixie Lee Crosby, early 19th-century entertainer
Edward Hull "Boss" Crump, politician, former mayor of Memphis
John Cullum, actor
Benny Cunningham, football player
Lowell Cunningham, comic-book writer
Elizabeth Litchfield Cunnyngham, missionary and church worker
Brandi Cyrus, singer
Miley Cyrus, singer
Noah Cyrus, singer

D

Rod Daniel, director
Orleans Darkwa, football player
Jeremy Davis, musician (originally from Arkansas)
Bill Dedman, journalist
Beauford Delaney, painter
Tony Delk, basketball player
Rick Dempsey, baseball player
George Roby Dempster, inventor
Jamie Denton, actor
Cleavant Derricks, actor, singer-songwriter
Clinton Derricks-Carroll, actor, musician 
Dale Dickey, actress
R. A. Dickey, baseball pitcher
Bobby Dodd, football coach
Shannen Doherty, actress
Andrew Jackson Donelson, diplomat
Aaron Douglas, painter
Christopher Douglas, actor
Josh Drake, music educator
Johnny Duncan, singer
King Dunlap, football player
Donald "Duck" Dunn (1941-2012), bassist
Natalia Dyer, actress

E

Justin Townes Earle, musician
John Early, comedian, actor
Edward H. East, acting governor
William Edmondson, folk art sculptor
Dan Evins, founder of Cracker Barrel

F

Nikki Fargas, basketball coach; grew up in Oak Ridge
David Farragut, admiral
Josh Farro, musician
Zac Farro, musician
Jerome Felton, football player
Larry Finch, basketball player
Chad Finchum, NASCAR driver
Ric Flair, professional wrestler
Lester Flatt, musician
Bruce Fleisher, golfer
Shelby Foote, author
Colin Ford, actor
Harold Ford Jr., politician
Tennessee Ernie Ford, entertainer
Nathan Bedford Forrest, American Civil War officer
Logan Forsythe, baseball player
Abe Fortas, U.S. Supreme Court justice
Ramon Foster, football player
Megan Fox, actress
Aretha Franklin, singer
Aubrayo Franklin
James B. Frazier, governor
Morgan Freeman, Academy Award-winning actor
Bill Frist, physician and politician
Phillip Fulmer, football coach

G

A. H. Garland (1832–1899), politician; born in Tipton County
Phil Garner, baseball player and manager
Marc Gasol, basketball player
Jacob Gentry, film director
Annie Somers Gilchrist, writer
Jim Gilliam, baseball player
Nikki Giovanni, educator
Guilford Glazer, land developer
Key Glock, rapper
GloRilla, rapper
Ernest William Goodpasture, physician
Ginnifer Goodwin, actress
Al Gore, former Tennessee Senator, 45th Vice President of the United States under Bill Clinton (1993–2001), and 2000 Democratic nominee for president
Albert Gore, Sr., politician, senator, father of Al Gore
Yo Gotti, rapper
Lou Graham, golfer, 1975 U.S. Open champion
Aaron Grant, football player
Sonny Gray, baseball player
Jack Greene, musician
Justin Grimm, baseball player
Red Grooms, artist

H

Wayne Haddix, football player
Lucy Hale, actress and singer; Pretty Little Liars
Alex Haley, author
Carla Hall, chef
George Hamilton, actor
Ken Hamlin, football player
W.C. Handy, composer
Anne Haney, actress
Jack Hanna, zookeeper 
William Happer, physicist 
Penny Hardaway, basketball player
Chris Hardwick, comedian, actor, television personality, and host of At Midnight with Chris Hardwick; born in Kentucky but raised in Memphis
Greg Hardy, football player
Bob Harper, personal trainer
Thelma Harper, U.S. Senator
George "Two Ton" Harris, professional wrestler
Isham G. Harris, governor and U.S. Senator
Mary Styles Harris, biologist, geneticist
Phil Harris, actor, singer, bandleader
Lori Harvey, model
Dennis Haskins, actor
James Haslam Jr., businessman, owner of NFL's Cleveland Browns
Trenton Hassell, basketball player
Donald Hawkins, football player
Whit Haydn, magician
Isaac Hayes, musician and actor
Henry D. Haynes, "Homer" of Homer and Jethro
Thomas "The Hitman" Hearns, boxer
Todd Helton, baseball player
Christina Hendricks, actress
Elaine Hendrix, actress
Dwight Henry, actor, baker
Jim Hickman, baseball player
Dont'a Hightower, football player
Hunter Hillenmeyer, football player
Thomas C. Hindman, Confederate general
Will Hoge, musician
Charles O. (Chad) Holliday, chief executive officer of Bank of America
Austin Hollins (born 1991), basketball player for Maccabi Tel Aviv of the Israeli Basketball Premier League 
Rick Honeycutt, baseball pitcher and coach
The Honky Tonk Man, professional wrestler
John Jay Hooker, attorney
Benjamin Hooks, minister, NAACP director
Ben W. Hooper, governor
Ed Hooper, author
Myles Horton, educator
Sam Houston, soldier and politician
Bailey Howell, basketball player
Allan B. Hubbard, National Economic Council Director 
Dakota Hudson, baseball player
Dick Hudson, football player
Thomas Hughes, English author of Tom Brown's School Days; founded Rugby, Tennessee
Yolanda Hughes-Heying, IFBB professional bodybuilder
Cordell Hull, U.S. Secretary of State; recipient, Nobel Peace Prize
Claude Humphrey, football player
Con Hunley, singer
Courtney Hunt, screenwriter and director
Alberta Hunter, blues singer
Les Hunter, basketball player
Dennis Hwang, graphic artist

J

Juicy J, rapper and producer
Al Jackson Jr. (1935-1975), drummer
Andrew Jackson, seventh President of the United States (1829–1837)
Howell Edmunds Jackson, Supreme Court Justice
Quinton Jackson, former UFC light heavyweight champion; born in Memphis
Samuel L. Jackson, actor
Mark Jacoby, performer
Claude Jarman Jr., actor
Jeff Jarrett, professional wrestler
Josh Jasper (born 1987), All-American college football player (placekicker)
Carol Mayo Jenkins, actress
Chad Jenkins, baseball player
John Jenkins, basketball player
William L. Jenkins, U.S. House of Representatives (R-TN-01) (1997–2007)
John Jerry, football player
Peria Jerry, football player
Michael Jeter, actor
Andrew Johnson, 17th President of the United States (1865–1869)
Thomas Johnson, football player
Cave Johnson, politician and U.S. Postmaster General (1865–1869)
Allan Jones, businessman and founder of Check Into Cash
Booker T. Jones (born 1944), multi-instrumentalist and songwriter
Cherry Jones, actress
Christopher Jones, actor
Ed "Too Tall" Jones, football player
Jesse Holman Jones, politician
Popeye Jones, basketball player
Van Jones, environmental advocate
Caleb Joseph, baseball player

K

Margaret Keane, artist
Josh Kear, songwriter
Josephine E. Keating, musician, music teacher, critic
Estes Kefauver, U.S. Senator
David Keith, actor
Frank B. Kelso II, admiral
K.Michelle, singer
Kem, singer
Tony Kemp, baseball player
Kesha, singer
Daniel Kilgore, football player
Johnny Knoxville, actor
Rachel Korine, actress
Bill Kovach, journalist
Joseph Wood Krutch, naturalist

L

"Nature Boy" Buddy Landel, professional wrestler
Dan Landrum, hammered-dulcimer player
Walter Lang, film director
Lucille La Verne, actress
Jerry "The King" Lawler, professional wrestler
Renee Lawless, actress, singer
William P. Lawrence, U.S. Navy Vice admiral (United States)
Arthur Lee, musician
Clyde Lee, basketball player
Kai-Fu Lee, Google executive
Adriane Lenox, actress
D. D. Lewis, football player
Steve Liddle, baseball coach
Beth Littleford, actress, comedian
Sondra Locke, actress
Z. Alexander Looby, lawyer
Horace Harmon Lurton, Supreme Court justice
Dustin Lynch, singer
Andrew Nelson Lytle, novelist

M

Jean (Faircloth) MacArthur, heiress, wife of General Douglas MacArthur
"Uncle Dave" Macon, musician and comedian
Bill Madlock, baseball player
Matt Mahaffey, musician
Johnny Majors, football coach
Delbert Mann, screenwriter and director
Nick Marable, freestyle wrestler
Jamie Marchi, voice actress
Shawn Marion, basketball player
Sterling Marlin, two-time Daytona 500 winner
Wink Martindale, television personality
Shaq Mason, football player
Christopher Massey, actor, rapper
Mike Massey, professional pool player
Matthew Fontaine Maury, oceanographer, astronomer
William Gibbs McAdoo, politician
Hill McAlister, governor
Macon McCalman, actor
Cormac McCarthy, novelist
Tim McCarver, baseball player and broadcaster
Byron McKeeby, artist and educator
Ted McClain, basketball player
Jacques McClendon, football player
Michael McDonald, singer
Brownie McGhee, musician
Stick McGhee, musician
Ralph McGill, journalist
Kenneth McKellar, politician
Reggie McKenzie, football player and executive
Bill McKinney, actor
Ellen McLain, opera singer, voice actress
Jon Meacham, publishing executive
Jodie Meeks, basketball player
Ron Mercer, basketball player
Cary Middlecoff, golfer
Jerry Minor, actor
Mike Minor, baseball pitcher
John Mitchell, baseball pitcher
Chris Moneymaker, poker player; from Knoxville
Ashley Monroe, singer
Grace Moore, opera soprano
Shelly Moore, Miss Teen USA 1997
Craig Morgan, singer
Lorrie Morgan, singer
Bryan Morris, baseball player
Gideon Morris, trans-Appalachian pioneer and founder of Morristown
Ricky Morton, professional wrestler
Anson Mount, writer
James Cole Mountflorence, 19th-century diplomat
Mary Noailles Murfree
Robert Myers, football player

N

Elise Neal, actress
Patricia Neal, Academy Award-winning actress
Lindsey Nelson, sportscaster
Johnny Neumann, basketball player
Josef Newgarden, Indy Car driver 
Robert Neyland, UT Vols football coach, namesake for Neyland Stadium
Alfred O. P. Nicholson, politician
Bishop James Daniel Niedergeses, clergyman
Kenneth Nixon, musician

O

Adolph Ochs, publisher
Oconostota
Joe O'Donnell, photojournalist
Michael Oher, football player
Joe Oliver, baseball player
Frank Omiyale, football player
Randall Keith Orton, professional wrestler
Claude Osteen, baseball pitcher
Jimmy Outlaw, baseball player
Park Overall, actress
Chord Overstreet, actor, singer
Major Owens, politician

P

Bettie Page, model
John Palmer, television journalist
Matt Palmer, baseball pitcher
Hermes Pan, choreographer
Paramore, four members from Franklin
Lara Parker, actress
Cindy Parlow, soccer player and coach
Chris Parnell, comedian
Wes Parsons, baseball pitcher
Hope Partlow, singer
Dolly Parton, singer and actress
Randy Parton, singer
Stella Parton, actress
Elizabeth Patterson, actress
Quinton Patton, NFL player
Cameron Payne, NBA player
Waylon Payne, singer
Minnie Pearl, comedian and Grand Ole Opry star
Puggy Pearson, professional poker player
Chad Pennington, NFL player
Sydney Penny, actress
Carl Perkins, musician
Michael Peterson, novelist, criminal
John J. Pettus, 23rd Governor of Mississippi (1859–1863)
John M. Pickard, actor
Landon Pigg, singer
Vada Pinson, baseball player
Dontari Poe, NFL player
Antoinette Van Leer Polk, southern belle and Baroness de Charette
James K. Polk, 11th President of the United States (1845–1849)
Leonidas Polk, bishop
VanLeer Polk, politician 
Sarah Childress Polk, First Lady of the United States, wife of President James K. Polk
Drew Pomeranz, baseball pitcher
James D. Porter, governor
Annie Potts, actress
Casey Prather (born 1991), basketball player in the Israeli Basketball Premier League
Elvis Presley, "king of rock and roll", actor
David Price, baseball pitcher
Tommy Prothro, football coach
Will Provine, historian of science 
Missi Pyle, actress and singer

Q

DJ Qualls, actor
Jimmy Quillen, politician

R

Dave Ramsey, author, motivational speaker
Jalen Ramsey, football player
John Rankin, abolitionist
John Crow Ransom, educator and critic
Isaiah Rashad, rapper and songwriter 
Wendell Rawls Jr., journalist
Robbie Ray, baseball player
Sam Rayburn, politician
J. J. Redick, basketball player
B. Carroll Reece
Florence Patton Reece, folk singer
Jerry Reese, football executive
Brad Renfro, actor
Garrett Reynolds, football player
Cynthia Rhodes, actress, singer
Grantland Rice, sportswriter
 Herb Rich (1928–2008), 2x All-Pro NFL football player
John S. Roane, 4th Governor of Arkansas (1849–1852)
Lee Roberson, educator
Rick Roberson, basketball player
Albert H. Roberts, governor
James Robertson, explorer
Oscar Robertson, basketball player
Pat Robertson, televangelist
Olan Rogers, comedian, actor
John Ross, Cherokee chief
Mitch Rouse, actor and director
Vic Rouse, basketball player
Mason Rudolph, golfer
Wilma Rudolph, athlete, Olympic gold medalist
Campy Russell, basketball player
Fred Russell, sportswriter
Thomas Clarke Rye, governor

S

Christine Sadler, journalist
Shane Salerno, screenwriter
Chip Saltsman, politician
William Sanderson, actor, Newhart, Deadwood, True Blood
Paul Satterfield, actor
Clarence Saunders, grocer
Dan Schneider, television producer
Aaron Schoenfeld (born 1990), Major League Soccer player
Tom Schulman, screenwriter
John T. Scopes, schoolteacher
Alvin Scott, basketball player
Hillary Scott, lead singer of Lady Antebellum
Josey Scott, lead singer of Saliva
Rhea Seddon, astronaut
John Seigenthaler, television journalist
John Michael Seigenthaler, television journalist
Gerald Sensabaugh, football player
Dewitt Clinton Senter, governor
Sequoyah, polymath of the Cherokee Nation
John Sevier, one of Tennessee's founding fathers
Paul Shanklin, satirist
Vicellous Reon Shannon, actor, The Hurricane, 24 Season 1
Cybill Shepherd, actress
William Shepherd, astronaut
T. G. Sheppard, singer
George Sherrill, baseball pitcher
John K. Shields, U.S. Senator
Pooh Shiesty, rapper
Dinah Shore, singer, actress and television personality
Daniel Simberloff, biologist
Walt Simonson, comic book writer/artist
Benjamin "Pap" Singleton, activist
Jonathan Singleton, singer-songwriter
Bessie Smith, singer
Bingo Smith, basketball player
Brent Smith, lead singer of Shinedown
Carl Smith, singer
Daniel Smith, surveyor
Lane Smith, actor
Lee Smith, football player
Rachel Smith, Miss USA 2007
Bobby Sowell (born 1947), musician, songwriter
Richard Speight Jr., actor
Steve Spurrier, football coach
Bethany Stahl, author
Edwin Starr, singer
Alfred Steele, CEO of PepsiCo
Lewie Steinberg (1933-2016), bassist
Ricky Stenhouse Jr., NASCAR driver
Andrew Stevens, actor and producer
Morgan Stevens, actor
Jim Stewart (born 1930), record producer and co-founder of Stax Records
Tom Stewart, U.S. Senator
James Stone, football player
John M. Stone, politician
Harry Stonecipher, aviation executive
Thomas S. Stribling, writer
Samuel Stritch, archbishop
Pat Summitt, basketball coach
Frank Sutton, actor
Grady Sutton, actor
Lynn Swann, football player 
Austin Swift, actor, brother of Taylor Swift
Taylor Swift, singer-songwriter and record producer

T

George Taliaferro, football player
Edward Talley, soldier; Medal of Honor recipient
Roscoe Tanner, tennis player
James Tappan (1825–1906), politician, lawyer, and Confederate general; born in Franklin
Quentin Tarantino, film director, actor, and screenwriter; born in Knoxville
Allen Tate, poet
Golden Tate, football player
Alfred A. Taylor, governor
Jordan Taylor, youtuber
Peter Taylor, author
Robert Love Taylor, governor and U.S. Senator
Carla Thomas (born 1942), singer, dubbed "the Queen of Memphis Soul"
J. Karen Thomas, actress, singer
Jake Thomas, actor
Lane Thomas, baseball player
Hugh F. Thomason (1826–1893), politician; born in Smith County
Fred Dalton Thompson, politician and actor
Three 6 Mafia
Faye Throneberry, baseball player
Marv Throneberry, baseball player
Isaac Tigrett, businessman, founder of Hard Rock Cafe
Justin Timberlake, singer and actor
Mageina Tovah, actress; Joan of Arcadia, the Spider-Man films
Andrew Triggs, baseball player
Cal Turner, co-founder of Dollar General
Elston Turner, basketball player
James Luther Turner, co-founder of Dollar General
Tina Turner, singer
Peter Turney, governor

U

 Ryan Upchurch, country music songwriter and rapper
 Reggie Upshaw (born 1995), basketball player in the Israel Basketball Premier League
Usher, entertainer

V

Anthony Wayne Van Leer, iron works owner 
Gore Verbinski, actor and director
Lark Voorhies, actress

W

Bill Wade, football player
Chuck Wagner, actor
Leon Wagner, baseball player
Barbara Jo Walker, Miss America 1947
William Walker, lawyer, journalist
Randall Wallace, screenwriter and director
Gretchen Walsh, swimmer
Herbert S. Walters, U.S. Senator
Darrell Waltrip, auto racer, winner of 1989 Daytona 500
Calvin Ward, soldier; Medal of Honor recipient
Koko B. Ware, professional wrestler
Mary Ware, poet and writer
Taylor Ware, singer
William W. Watkins (1826–1898), politician; born in Jefferson County
Cameron Watson, actor and director
Robert Penn Warren, author
David Weathers, baseball pitcher
Lucy Webb, comedian
Ida B. Wells, journalist (originally from Mississippi)
Kitty Wells, singer
Scott Wells, football player
David West, baseball pitcher
Red West, stuntman, actor, associate of Elvis Presley
James Westerfield, actor
Kent Whitaker, culinary writer, chef (born in Kentucky, raised in Nashville)
Hugh Lawson White, politician
Reggie White, football player, Hall of Famer
Ed Whitson, baseball pitcher
John S. Wilder, politician
Snootie Wild, rapper 
Dan Williams, football player
Elliot Williams, basketball player
Hank Williams III, singer
Hayley Williams, singer for Paramore (originally from Mississippi)
Louis Williams, basketball player
Shawne Williams, basketball player
Sonny Boy Williamson, blues musician
Patrick Willis, football player
Cedrick Wilson, football player
E. Bright Wilson, chemist
Oprah Winfrey, talk show host, actress, producer (originally from Mississippi)
Don Wise, saxophonist, music producer, songwriter
Tim Wise, activist
Reese Witherspoon, Academy Award-winning actress
Jason Witten, football player, Dallas Cowboys
Brandan Wright, basketball player
Clyde Wright, baseball pitcher
K. J. Wright, football player

Y

Susan Yeagley, actress
Moneybagg Yo, rapper 
Alvin York, World War I soldier who captured 132 Germans almost single-handedly, Sergeant York
Taylor York, guitarist
Bob Young, TV producer
Young Buck, rapper
Chris Young, singer, winner of Nashville Star
Thaddeus Young, basketball player

Z

Chris Zachary, baseball player
Felix Zollicoffer, American Civil War general, congressman

See also

By educational institution affiliation

 List of Baylor School alumni
 List of leaders of the University of Tennessee at Chattanooga
 List of Sewanee: The University of the South people
 List of Tennessee State University presidents
 List of University of Memphis people
 List of University of Tennessee people
 List of Vanderbilt University people

By governmental office

 List of governors of Tennessee
 List of justices of the Tennessee Supreme Court
 List of lieutenant governors of Tennessee
 List of speakers of the Tennessee House of Representatives
 List of United States senators from Tennessee
 List of United States representatives from Tennessee

By location

 List of people from Chattanooga, Tennessee
 List of people from Knoxville, Tennessee
 List of people from Memphis, Tennessee
 List of people from Nashville, Tennessee

References 

Lists of people from Tennessee